Roxbury is a town in Litchfield County, Connecticut, United States. The population was 2,260 at the 2020 census.

History

Roxbury, whose Native name was Shepaug, a Mahican word signifying "rocky water", was settled about 1713. Originally a part of Woodbury, the town was incorporated in October 1796. Roxbury is either descriptively named, or the name is a transfer from Roxbury, Massachusetts.

Mine Hill and its minerals have been associated with Roxbury since the middle of the 18th century. A silver mine was opened here and was later found to contain spathic iron, specially adapted to steel making, and a small smelting furnace was built. The abundance of granite found in many of Mine Hill's quarries provided the building material for the ore roaster and blast furnace, as well as for such world wonders as the Brooklyn Bridge and Grand Central Terminal in New York City.

Geography
Roxbury is in southern Litchfield County and is bordered to the south by New Haven County.

Principal communities
Judd's Bridge
Roxbury Center
Roxbury Falls
Roxbury Station

On the National Register of Historic Places

Three places in Roxbury are included on the National Register of Historic Places. They are:
Roxbury Center (CT 67, Weller's Bridge Rd., South and Church streets); 32 buildings in designated local historic district.
Roxbury Iron Mine and Furnace Complex
Roxbury Station Historic District (added 2009) (CT 67, Botsford Hill, Hodge, and Mine Hill Roads)

Demographics

As of the census of 2000, there were 2,136 people, 848 households, and 620 families residing in the town. The racial makeup of the town was 97.24% White, 0.23% African American, 0.19% Native American, 0.94% Asian, 0.66% from other races, and 0.75% from two or more races. Hispanic or Latino of any race were 1.31% of the population.

There were 848 households, out of which 29.2% had children under the age of 18 living with them, 66.5% were married couples living together, 4.2% had a female householder with no husband present, and 26.8% were non-families. 20.3% of all households were made up of individuals, and 7.1% had someone living alone who was 65 years of age or older.  The average household size was 2.52 and the average family size was 2.95.

In the town, the population was spread out, with 22.8% under the age of 18, 3.7% from 18 to 24, 25.5% from 25 to 44, 34.3% from 45 to 64, and 13.8% who were 65 years of age or older.  The median age was 44 years. For every 100 females, there were 104.0 males.  For every 100 females age 18 and over, there were 102.0 males.

The median income for a household in the town was $87,794, and the median income for a family was $97,672. Males had a median income of $61,477 versus $45,417 for females. The per capita income for the town was $56,769.  About 3.0% of families and 3.9% of the population were below the poverty line, including 4.1% of those under age 18 and 6.3% of those age 65 or over.

Transportation
Connecticut Route 67 is the main thoroughfare in the town, leading west  to New Milford and southeast  to Southbury. The town is also served by secondary highways Route 199 (leading north  to Washington) and Route 317 (leading east  to Woodbury).

Roads in Roxbury on the List of Connecticut State Scenic Highways
The following roads are Connecticut State Scenic Highways:
Connecticut Route 317; 0.40 from Painter Hill Road, west to Route 67. (added November 14, 1990)
Connecticut Route 67; 0.87 mile from Ranny Hill Road, south to 0.30 mile south of Route 317. (added November 14, 1990)
Connecticut Route 67; 2.90 miles from the Roxbury/Bridgewater Town line, east to Ranny Hill Road. (added August 23, 1996)

Local media
Waterbury Republican-American, a Waterbury-based independent daily newspaper
The Danbury News-Times, a Danbury-based daily newspaper
The Greater New Milford Spectrum, a MediaNews Group-owned weekly paper
Voices, a local newspaper serving Southbury, Middlebury, Oxford, Seymour, Naugatuck, Woodbury, Bethlehem, New Preston, Washington, Washington Depot, Roxbury, Bridgewater, Monroe, Sandy Hook and Newtown.

Education
Regional School District 12 operates the Booth Free School in Roxbury, as well as the Shepaug Valley School (secondary) in Washington.

Notable people

 Remember Baker (1737–1775), militiaman 
 Candace Bushnell, author, journalist and television producer
 Alexander Calder (1898–1976), artist
 Graydon Carter (born 1949), editor, Vanity Fair
 Tom Cole, playwright
 Dustin Hoffman (born 1937), actor
 Lindsey Jacobellis (born 1985), Olympic athlete
 Marianna Mayer (born 1945), children's book author and illustrator, "Baba Yaga and Vasilisa the Brave", "Pegasus", and "The Twelve Dancing Princesses"                         
 Mercer Mayer (born 1943), children's book author (Little Critter)
 Frank McCourt (1930–2009), author, Angela's Ashes
 Arthur Miller (1915–2005), playwright
 Rebecca Miller (born 1962), actress and filmmaker
 Marilyn Monroe (1926–1962), actress
 Inge Morath (1923–2002), Austrian photographer
 Ron Norsworthy (born 1966), visual artist and designer
 Rex Reed (born 1938), film critic
 Stephen Sondheim (1930–2021), composer and lyricist
 William Styron  (1925–2006), author, Sophie's Choice
 Gay Talese, writer and journalist
 Joe Wanag (born 1966), Olympic athlete
 Seth Warner (1743–1784), Green Mountain Boys
 Richard Widmark (1914–2008), actor

References

External links

Town of Roxbury official website
Shepaug Regional School District #12

Towns in Litchfield County, Connecticut
Towns in the New York metropolitan area
Towns in Connecticut